Andrea Kropp (June 25, 1993) is an American swimmer. She competed at the 2011 World University Games winning a silver medal in the 200m breast. She also placed third in the 200m breast at the 2012 US Olympic Swimming Trials. Kropp swam at Princeton University but transferred to USC to pursue making the US Olympic Swimming Team.

References

1993 births
Living people
American female swimmers
Princeton Tigers women's swimmers
USC Trojans women's swimmers
Universiade medalists in swimming
Universiade silver medalists for the United States
American female breaststroke swimmers
Medalists at the 2011 Summer Universiade
21st-century American women